Lee Nam-su (Korean:이남수; born 21 May 1976), also spelled as Lee Nam-soo, is a South Korean handball player. She competed in the women's tournament at the 2000 Summer Olympics with the South Korean team.

References

External links

1976 births
Living people
South Korean female handball players
Olympic handball players of South Korea
Handball players at the 2000 Summer Olympics
Place of birth missing (living people)
Asian Games medalists in handball
Handball players at the 1998 Asian Games
Handball players at the 2002 Asian Games
Asian Games gold medalists for South Korea
Medalists at the 1998 Asian Games
Medalists at the 2002 Asian Games
21st-century South Korean women